Conrad III may refer to:

Conrad III of Provence (Conrad I of Burgundy) (c. 925 – 993)
Conrad III, Duke of Bavaria (1052–1055)
Conrad III, Duke of Carinthia (died 1061)
Conrad III of Germany (1093–1152)
Conrad III of Dachau (died 1182)
Conrad III of Jerusalem (1252–1268)
Conrad III of Wittelsbach, Archbishop of Salzburg (ca. 1120/1125 – 1200)
Conrad III Zoellner of Rotenstein (died 1390)
Konrad III the Old, duke of Oleśnica